The Minnesota Golden Gophers women's ice hockey program represented the University of Minnesota during the 2015-16 NCAA Division I women's ice hockey season. The program advanced to the Frozen Four championship game for the fifth consecutive year and defeated the Boston College Eagles by a 3–1 tally in the title game.

Offseason

Recruiting

Roster

2015–16 Golden Gophers

Exhibition
Sarah Potomak made her debut for the Minnesota Golden Gophers in a September 25, 2015 exhibition match against the Minnesota Whitecaps logging two assists on goals scored by Hannah Brandt as the squad prevailed by a 5-4 tally.

Regular season

News and notes
Sarah Potomak's regular season debut took place on October 1, 2015 in a 2-0 win against Penn State. Potomak scored an empty net goal, for the first goal of her NCAA career. In a two-game sweep of St. Cloud State on October 9–10, 2015, Potomak accumulated two goals and four assists. In the second game against St. Cloud, she logged the first multi-goal game of her NCAA career.
An 11-1 win against the MSU-Mankato Mavericks in November 2015 saw Sarah Potomak tie the program record for most points in one game. She would register a seven-point output consisting two goals and five assists. Potomak was featured in Sports Illustrated’s Faces in the Crowd segment for the week of December 14, 2015.

2015-16 Schedule

|-
!colspan=12 style="background:#AF1E2D;color:#FFC61E;"| Regular Season

|-
!colspan=12 style="background:#AF1E2D;color:#FFC61E;"| WCHA Tournament

|-
!colspan=12 style="background:#AF1E2D;color:#FFC61E;"| NCAA Tournament

Source:

NCAA
Sarah Potomak, 2015-16 WCHA Preseason Rookie of the Year
Sarah Potomak, WCHA Rookie of the Week (Week of October 13, 2015)
Sarah Potomak, WCHA Player of the Week (Recognized for games of October 14–15, 2016) 
Sarah Potomak, WCHA Player of the Month (October 2016) 
Sarah Potomak, 2016 Women's Hockey Commissioners Association National Rookie of the Year Award
Sarah Potomak, 2016 WCHA Rookie of the Year honors
Sarah Potomak, Most Outstanding Player Award, 2016 NCAA National Collegiate Women's Ice Hockey Tournament

Hannah Brandt, Forward, Patty Kazmaier Award Top 10 Finalist 

Dani Cameranesi, Forward, Patty Kazmaier Award Top 10 Finalist

Dani Cameranesi, Forward, WCHA Scoring Leader 

Lee Stecklein, Defense, WCHA First Team All-Star

Hannah Brandt, Forward, WCHA First Team All-Star

Dani Cameranesi, Forward, WCHA First Team All-Star

Milica McMillen, Defense, WCHA Second Team All-Star

Sarah Potomak, Forward, WCHA Third Team All-Star

Sarah Potomak, Forward, WCHA All-Rookie Team

References

Minnesota
Minnesota Golden Gophers women's ice hockey seasons
Minn
NCAA women's ice hockey Frozen Four seasons
NCAA women's ice hockey championship seasons
Minne
Minne